Jean-François Damphousse (born July 21, 1979) is a Canadian former professional ice hockey goaltender. He played six games in the National Hockey League with the New Jersey Devils during the 2001–02 season. The rest of his career, which lasted from 1999 to 2005, was mainly spent in the American Hockey League. He is currently a scout for the National Hockey League

Early life
Damphousse was born in Saint-Alexis-des-Monts, Quebec. As a youth, he played in the 1992 and 1993 Quebec International Pee-Wee Hockey Tournaments with minor ice hockey teams from Central Mauricie, and Sainte-Foy, Quebec City.

Career 
Damphousse was drafted by the New Jersey Devils in the first round of the 1997 NHL Entry Draft with the 24th overall pick. After playing three years of junior hockey with the Moncton Wildcats of the Quebec Major Junior Hockey League, and a brief stop with the Augusta Lynx of the ECHL, Damphousse moved up to the Devils' American Hockey League affiliate, the Albany River Rats. In the 2001–02 NHL season, Damphousse made his only National Hockey League appearances, playing in six games with the Devils.

In the seasons following his brief NHL experience, Damphousse bounced around the AHL, playing for the Cincinnati Mighty Ducks, Saint John Flames and Hamilton Bulldogs. He also appeared in 53 games for Quebec Radio X of the Ligue Nord-Américaine de Hockey in the 2004–05 season.

Career statistics

Regular season and playoffs

References

External links

1979 births
Living people
Albany River Rats players
Augusta Lynx players
Canadian ice hockey goaltenders
Cincinnati Mighty Ducks players
French Quebecers
Hamilton Bulldogs (AHL) players
Ice hockey people from Quebec
Moncton Wildcats players
National Hockey League first-round draft picks
New Jersey Devils draft picks
New Jersey Devils players
People from Mauricie
Saint John Flames players